Robert Charles Jones (born November 27, 1945) is a Canadian professional ice hockey player who played two games in the National Hockey League (NHL) and 161 games in the World Hockey Association (WHA).  He played with the NHL's New York Rangers and the WHA's Los Angeles Sharks, New York Raiders, New York Golden Blades, Jersey Knights, Michigan Stags, Baltimore Blades, and Indianapolis Racers. Jones' younger brother, Jim Jones, also played in the NHL.

External links

1945 births
Living people
Baltimore Blades players
Canadian ice hockey centres
Guelph Royals players
Ice hockey people from Ontario
Indianapolis Racers players
Los Angeles Sharks players
Michigan Stags players
Jersey Knights players
New York Golden Blades players
New York Raiders players
New York Rangers players
People from Espanola, Ontario